The 1980–81 Michigan Wolverines men's basketball team represented the University of Michigan in intercollegiate college basketball during the 1980–81 NCAA Division I men's basketball season. The team played its home games in the Crisler Arena in Ann Arbor, Michigan, and was a member of the Big Ten Conference. Under the direction of first-year head coach Bill Frieder, the team finished tied for sixth in the Big Ten Conference. The team earned an invitation to the 1981 National Invitation Tournament. Although the team was ranked in the Associated Press Top Twenty Poll for eleven of the sixteen weeks reaching a peak at number nine, it began and finished the season unranked and it also ended the season unranked in the final UPI Coaches' Poll. The team was led by All-American Mike McGee. The team set the current Big Ten conference record by playing in six overtime games. That season McGee also set the current conference record for career field goals attempted (2077). McGee set several other records, which have since been broken: career points (2439, broken in 1989 by Glen Rice), career points (conference games only) (1503, broken in 1995), single-season field goals made (309, broken in 1986) and career field goals made (1010, broken in 1993). No Wolverine would surpass 13 assists in a game until Gary Grant twice recorded 14 in December 1987. The team's field goal percentage of 51.1 was a school record that lasted four years. McGee's 3941 minutes and 34.3 minutes per game stood as school records until 1987 and 1984 respectively. Marty Bodnar earned first team Academic All-American honors, while Mark Bodnar was a third team selection. Paul Heuerman and Thad Garner served as team captains, while McGee earned team MVP. McGee ended his career with a school record 112 starts. The record would last for six years.

In the 32-team National Invitation Tournament, Michigan advanced to the elite eight round by defeating the  74–58 and   80–68 before losing to  91–76.

Roster

Rankings

See also
NIT all-time team records
NIT bids by school and conference
NIT championships and semifinal appearances

Team players drafted into the NBA
Seven players from this team were selected in the NBA Draft.

References

Michigan
Michigan Wolverines men's basketball seasons
Michigan
Michigan Wolve
Michigan Wolve